Roscón is a sweet bread-based ring-shaped dessert. They are eaten in Spanish  cuisine. 

The Roscón de Reyes, Roscón of Kings, is a Spanish cuisine tradition eaten on the Epiphany, January 6. These are fancier, larger, decorated versions of the ring cakes.

Gallery

References 

Colombian cuisine
Cakes
Guava dishes